Darrylia is a genus of sea snails, marine gastropod mollusks in the family Horaiclavidae.

It was previously included tentatively within the subfamily Crassispirinae of the family Turridae.

Description
Species in this genus show a broad protoconch with 1.5 whorls and without spiral ornamentation. The claviform shell contains strong axial ribs, crossed by narrower spiral cords, and lacks a sutural cord. The elongate-ovate aperture measures about ⅓ of the total length of the shell. The lip shows a strong varix.

Species
Species within the genus Darrylia include:
 Darrylia abdita Espinosa & Ortea, 2018
 Darrylia bizantina Espinosa & Ortea, 2018
 Darrylia clendenini (García, 2008)
 Darrylia harryleei García, 2008
 Darrylia kleinrosa (Usticke, 1969) (synonyms: Miraclathurella kleinrosa (Nowell-Usticke, 1969); Drillia kleinrosa Nowell-Usticke, 1969)
 Darrylia maisiana Espinosa & Ortea, 2018
 Darrylia peggywilliamsae (Fallon, 2010)

References

External links
 E.F. Garcia, Eight new molluscan species (Gastropoda, Turridae) from the Western Atlantic with the description of two new genera; Novapex vol. 9 (2008)

 
Horaiclavidae
Gastropod genera